In almost all modern Slavic languages, only one type of aspectual opposition governs verbs, verb phrases and verb-related structures, manifesting in two grammatical aspects: perfective and imperfective (in contrast with English verb grammar, which conveys several aspectual oppositions: perfect vs. neutral;  progressive vs. nonprogressive; and in the past tense, habitual ("used to ...") vs. neutral). The aspectual distinctions exist on the lexical level - speakers have no universal method of forming a perfective verb from a given imperfective one (or conversely). Perfective verbs are most often formed by means of prefixes, changes in the root, using a completely different root (suppletion), or changes in stress. Possessing a prefix does not necessarily mean that a verb is perfective.

General characteristics 
With a few exceptions, each Slavic verb is either perfective or imperfective. Most verbs form canonical pairs of one perfective and one imperfective verb with generally the same meaning. However, each Slavic language contains a number of bi-aspectual verbs, which may be used as both imperfective and perfective. They are mainly borrowings from non-Slavic languages, but some native verbs also belong to this group. As opposed to them, mono-aspectual verbs are mainly native. There are mono-aspectual imperfective verbs without perfective equivalents (among others, verbs with the meaning "to be" and "to have" - note however that Russian does have a rarely used perfective form of "to be", and thus also "to have" via the usual U-construction - namely, "побыть") as well as perfective verbs without imperfective equivalents (for instance, verbs with the meaning "become ...", e.g. "to become paralyzed", etc.; Russian distinguishes these again, namely, for this example, "парализовать(ся)", perfective, vs "парализовывать(ся)", imperfective, even despite the root "парализ-", paraliz-, is non-native).

Aspect in Slavic is a superior category in relation to tense or mood. Particularly, some verbal forms (like infinitive) cannot distinguish tense but they still distinguish aspect. Here is the list of Polish verb forms formed by both imperfective and perfective verbs (such a list is similar in other Slavic languages). The example is an imperfective and a perfective Polish verb with the meaning 'to write'. All personal forms are given in third person, masculine singular, with Russian analog if it exists:
 Infinitive: pisać - napisać / писать - написать
 Passive participle: pisany - napisany / писаный - написанный
 Gerund: pisanie - napisanie / писание - написание
 Past impersonal form: pisano - napisano / писано - написано
 Past impersonal form in subjunctive: pisano by - napisano by 
 Past tense: pisał - napisał / писал - написал
 Future tense: będzie pisać / będzie pisał - napisze / будет писать - напишет
 Conditional, first form: pisałby - napisałby / писал бы - написал бы
 Conditional, second form: byłby pisał - byłby napisał 
 Imperative: niech pisze - niech napisze / пусть пишет - пусть напишет

The following may be formed only if the verb is imperfective:
 Contemporary adverbial participle – pisząc / пиша exists, albeit not commonly used
 Active participle – piszący / пишущий, писучий (paronymic pair)
 Present tense – pisze / пишет

One form may be created only if the verb is perfective, namely:
 Anterior adverbial participle – napisawszy / написав(ши)

Roles 
The perfective aspect allows the speaker to describe the action as finished, completed, finished in the natural way. The imperfective aspect does not present the action as finished, but rather as pending or ongoing.

An example is the verb "to eat" in the Serbo-Croatian. The verb translates either as jesti (imperfective) or pojesti (perfective). Now, both aspects could be used in the same tense of the language. For example, (omitting, for simplicity, feminine forms like jela):

Ja sam pojeo signals that the action was completed. Its meaning can be given as "I ate (something) and I finished eating (it)"; or "I ate (something) up".

Ja sam jeo signals that the action took place (at a specified moment, or in the course of one's life, or every day, etc.); it may mean "I was eating", "I ate" or "I have been eating".

The following examples are from Polish.

Imperfective verbs convey:
 actions and states in progress, just ongoing states and actions, with significant course (in opinion of the speaker);
 actions that serve as a background for other (perfective) actions, ex. czytałem książkę, gdy zadzwonił telefon 'I was reading the book when the telephone rang';
 simultaneous actions, ex. będę czytać książkę, podczas gdy brat będzie pisać list 'I will be reading the book while brother will be writing the letter';
 durative actions, lasting through some time, e.g. krzyczał 'he was shouting', będzie drgać 'it will be vibrating';
 aimless motions, ex. chodzę 'I am walking here and there';
 multiple (iterative) actions, ex. dopisywać 'to insert many times to the text', będziemy wychodziły 'we will go out (many times)';
 actions heading towards no or an unspecified purpose: będę pisał list 'I will be writing the letter';
 continuous states, ex. będę stać 'I will be standing'.

Perfective verbs can refer to the past or to the future, but not to present actions – an action happening now cannot be ended, so it cannot be perfective. Perfective verbs convey:

 states and actions that are seen as having finished (even if a second ago) or becoming so in a future time-point, have no significant course, have short duration or are treated as a whole by the speaker, ex. krzyknął 'he shouted', drgnie 'it will stir (only once)';
 single-time actions, ex. dopisać 'to insert to the text', wyszedł 'he went out';
 actions whose goals are seen as having been achieved, even if with difficulty, ex. przeczytałem 'I have read', doczytała się 'she finished reading and found what she had sought';
 circumstantial actions leading up to a state, ex. pokochała 'she came to love', zrozumiesz 'you (sg.) will understand', poznamy 'we will get to know';
 the beginning of the action or the state, ex. wstanę 'I will stand up' (and I will stand), zaczerwienił się 'he reddened';
 the end of the action or the state, ex. dośpiewaj 'sing until the end';
 actions executed in many places, on many objects or by many subjects at the same time, ex. powynosił 'he carried out (many things)', popękają 'They will break out in many places', poucinać 'To cut off many items';
 actions or states when they are seen as constituting a lexeme-specific block of time (Aktionsart), ex. postoję 'I will stand for a little time', pobył 'he was (there) for some time'.

Most simple Polish verbs are imperfective (as in other Slavic languages), ex. iść 'to walk, to go', nieść 'to carry', pisać 'to write'. But there are also few simple perfective verbs, ex. dać 'to give', siąść 'to sit down'. Also, many perfective verbs with suffixes and without prefixes exist, ex. krzyknąć 'to shout', kupić 'to buy' (cf. the imperfective kupować with a different suffix).

Special imperfective verbs express aimless motions. They are mono-aspectual, i.e., they have no perfective equivalents. They are formed from other imperfective verbs by stem alternations or suppletion, ex. nosić 'to carry around' (from nieść), chodzić 'to walk around, to go around' (from iść 'to go, to walk'). When such a verb is supplemented with an explicit aim or direction, an iterative sense is conveyed: chodzić do szkoły 'to go to school (usually, repeatedly, on several occasions)'.

Other iteratives build another group of mono-aspectual imperfective verbs. They are formed from other imperfective verbs, including the previous group: chadzać 'to walk around usually (from chodzić), jadać 'to eat usually' (from jeść 'to eat'). Neither group is very numerous: most Polish verbs cannot form iterative counterparts.

Those perfective verbs that express actions executed in many places, on many objects, or by many subjects at the same time, and those that are seen as constituting a lexeme-specific block of time have no imperfective counterpart. They are formed with the prefix po- (which can have other functions as well).

States and actions that are seen as constituting a lexeme-specific block of time can be expressed by means of both imperfective and perfective verbs: cały dzień leżał w łóżku 'he was in bed all day long' (literally: 'he lay in bed') means nearly the same as cały dzień przeleżał w łóżku. The difference is mainly stylistic: imperfective is neutral here, while using perfective causes stronger tone of the statement.

In most Slavic languages, including Polish, a present perfective verb form may stand by itself as future tense. More often than not grammars of these languages state that perfective verbs have no present tense but a simple future tense and imperfective verbs have present tense and only a compound future. In other languages, most notably Bulgarian, a perfective verb form may be used in its present tense only in compound forms. Examples: in Polish it is possible to say kupię chleb to mean I will buy [some] bread (and not *I buy some bread). In Bulgarian it is only possible to say ще купя хляб (I will buy [some] bread) or да купя ли хляб? (Shall I buy [some] bread).

Morphology of aspect in Slavic languages

Prefixes 
Many perfective verbs are formed from simple imperfectives by prefixation. Various prefixes are used without any strict rules. In the context of specific verbs, the question of whether any given prefix carries a semantically neutral or canonical perfective sense is not straightforward; distinctions in meaning and dialectical differences influence the choice. For example: the perfective counterpart to malować is pomalować when it means 'to paint a wall; to fill with a color', or namalować when it means 'to paint a picture; to depict sth/sb'.

Changes in the stem or ending 
Besides the canonical perfective counterpart, a number of secondary prefixed verbs may be formed from a given simple imperfective verb. They all have similar but distinct meaning and they form, as a rule, their own imperfective equivalents by means of suffixation (attaching suffixes) or stem alternation. Examples:
 prać 'to wash / clean clothes with water and soap / washing powder' is a simple imperfective verb;
 uprać is its canonical perfective counterpart, while doprać, przeprać are secondary derived perfective verbs with slightly different meanings;
 dopierać, przepierać are secondary imperfective verbs that are counterparts for doprać, przeprać respectively; *upierać does not exist because the basic verb prać is the imperfective counterpart of uprać. (coincidentally upierać is an imperfective of a completely different verb uprzeć, typically used as reflexive verb uprzeć się)

Other examples include:

Suppletion 
A small group of imperfective-perfective pairs results from suppletion. For example, in Polish:

Other 
Some verbs form their aspectual counterparts by simultaneous prefixation and suffixation, ex. (the first one is imperfective) stawiać - postawić 'to set up'.

Contrast between a perfective and an imperfective verb may be also indicated by stress, e.g. Russian perfective осы́пать, imperfective осыпа́ть (to strew, shower, heap upon something).

References

External links 
 Clarence A. Manning: English Tenses and Slavic Aspects

Slavic languages
Grammatical aspects